

The CAMS 58 was a transport flying boat built in France in the early 1930s intended as a successor to the highly successful CAMS 53. Compared to the earlier design, the CAMS 58 featured a newly designed Biplane wing cellule and an all-metal hull in place of its predecessor's wooden hull. Work was slow, with three years passing from the start of design work to the prototype's first flight. When the newly formed Air France showed no interest in purchasing the type, CAMS redesigned it to be powered by two pairs of engines in tractor-pusher installations. Again, no interest was forthcoming. The final iteration of the design, reverting to a single pair of more powerful engines and a wooden hull, met with only slightly more success. Air France bought two machines and operated them briefly before declaring them uneconomical and removing them from service.

Variants
 58/0 - prototype with Hispano-Suiza 12Fa engines (one built)
 58/2 - four-engine version with Lorraine 9Na Algol engines (one built)
 58/3 - version with Hispano-Suiza 12Nbr engines (two built)

Specifications (58/3)

References

 
 

58
1930s French airliners
Flying boats
Biplanes
Twin-engined push-pull aircraft
Aircraft first flown in 1933